Cehal is a commune of 1,573 inhabitants situated in Satu Mare County, Crișana, Romania. It is composed of three villages: Cehal, Cehăluț (the commune center; Magyarcsaholy) and Orbău (Tasnádorbó).

Demographics
Ethnic groups (2011 census): 
Romanians: 66.4%
Hungarians: 33.3%

Natives
 Zoltán Sztáray

References

Communes in Satu Mare County
Localities in Crișana